Olin Sang Ruby Union Institute (OSRUI) is a Jewish overnight summer camp and conference center located in Oconomowoc, Wisconsin. The camp attracts over 1,000 children each summer, mainly from the United States and Canada. It serves children in second through twelfth grades in a variety of programs, including specialized arts and Hebrew language units.

History

Olin Sang Ruby was founded in 1952 and was the first summer camp of the Reform Movement of Judaism. Its founding director was Rabbi Herman Schaalman. The camp has operated continuously on the same property since its founding.

The camp has been a major source of Jewish musical output over the past several decades, hosting the Hava Nashira song leaders workshop. Popular Jewish singers and composers including Debbie Friedman, Craig Taubman, Danny Maseng, and Dan Nichols, among others, have all served on the faculty of Hava Nashira. Friedman also served as a songleader at the camp in the 1970's, which is where she started her musical career. OSRUI was also briefly home to Sofer, the Jewish Writers Workshop, which brought prominent authors to the institute to teach writing.

Staff
The camp's director is Solomon "Solly" Kane. He was preceded by Gerard W. "Jerry" Kaye, who served in the position for 48 years before his retirement.

Notable persons

Staff and Faculty
Debbie Friedman, singer/songwriter. Former camp song leader. Co-founder of Hava Nashira.
Danny Maseng, composer, singer and actor. Founding director of the Tiferet arts program. Former director of Hava Nashira.
Dan Nichols, singer/songwriter. Faculty for Hava Nashira.
Cantor Jeff Klepper, singer/songwriter. Co-founder of Hava Nashira.
Julie Silver, singer/songwriter. Faculty for Hava Nashira.
Rabbi Herman Schaalman, founding director of OSRUI.
Gerald Stern, American poet. Faculty for the Jewish Writers Workshop.
Rodger Kamenetz, American author. Faculty for the Jewish Writers Workshop.
Steve Stern, American author. Faculty for the Jewish Writers Workshop.
Howard Schwartz, Folklorist and author. Faculty for the Jewish Writers Workshop.
Senator Russell Feingold, US Senator for Wisconsin. Served as faculty for the Lerhaus program. Also sent his children to OSRUI.
Osvaldo Romberg, served as a visiting artist at the Tiferet arts program.
Rabbi Arnold Jacob Wolf, important American Jewish leader of the 20th century. Former faculty and Rabbinic Advisor.
Gary P. Zola, Professor of Jewish History at HUC-JIR. Former unit head of Chalutzim Hebrew immersion program.

Campers
Jason Brown, Olympic Bronze medalist in Figure Skating.
Garrett Weber-Gale, Olympic Gold medalist in Swimming.
Rebecca Jarvis, American journalist.
Joe Mande, comedian.
Jeff Erlanger, disability rights activist. Also served as a counselor.
Amy Webb, American futurist and author.
Daniel B. Shapiro, American diplomat and former US Ambassador to Israel.
Leor Weber, Counsler

References

External links

Jewish summer camps in Wisconsin
Reform Judaism in Wisconsin
Reform summer camps
Youth organizations based in Wisconsin